The 1987 Hills Bros. Coffee Kings season was the 2nd season of the franchise in the Philippine Basketball Association (PBA).

Transactions

Awards
Elpidio "Yoyoy" Villamin was awarded Most Outstanding Pro Player of the year for the 1987 season by the Sports and Columnist Organization of the Philippines (SCOOP). Villamin was also named Most Improved Player for the season by the PBA and he made it to the Mythical five selection, placing second to Alberto Guidaben for the Most Valuable Player (MVP) plum.

Notable dates
March 31: Import Francois Wise scored 46 points as Hills Bros carved out a come-from-behind 102-98 win over Formula Shell. Both teams were winless in two games before their match. Wise came back with his fourth team in five years, replacing Tony Neal. 

July 12: Bogs Adornado scored on a jumper and a foul from Leo Austria with two seconds left as the Coffee Kings eked out a 104-101 win over Formula Shell at the start of the All-Filipino Conference. The Spark Aiders battled back from a 94-101 deficit to level the count at 101-all with 20 seconds remaining on a rare four-point play and a three-pointer from Leo Austria.

August 9: Yoyoy Villamin produced his first triple-double performance of 20 points, 16 rebounds and 11 assists to power Hills Bros to a 107-103 victory over Great Taste at the start of the semifinal round in the All-Filipino Conference. 

October 13: After two losses, Hills Bros scored their first win in the Reinforced Conference, routing San Miguel Beermen, 129-94. Import Jose Slaughter scored 52 points for the Coffee Kings. The Beermen absorbed its first setback in four games. 

October 18: Jose Slaughter scored 79 points and a record-breaking 14 triples in Hills Bros' 129-115 win over Great Taste Instant Milk. Slaughter's feat surpasses the 13 three-pointers previously made by Rob Williams of Tanduay Rhum last season. 

December 1: Jose Slaughter sank in the follow-up shot with two seconds left that carried Hills Bros to an 89-87 victory over Ginebra San Miguel in their knockout game and sent the Coffee Kings into the championship playoffs against San Miguel Beermen.

Occurrences
Former Tanduay coach Arturo Valenzona takes over from Nat Canson, who resigned as the Coffee Kings head coach after the PBA/IBA series, Canson led Hills Bros to a runner-up finish in the All-Filipino Conference.

Finals stint
The Coffee Kings had two bridesmaid finishes for the season, losing to Great Taste Coffee in the All-Filipino Conference and San Miguel Beermen in the Reinforced Conference.

Roster

Imports

References

Alaska Aces (PBA) seasons
Hill